Dame Jill Ellison, DBE (born 31 January 1955) is Director of Nursing, Heart of England NHS Foundation Trust. She was educated at St Margaret's School, Bushey and now heads the Nurse Directors Association (NDA/UK).

The NDA is an independent organisation with membership open to all Nurse Directors and Senior Nurses working in NHS organisations, and equivalent posts in the Armed Forces, private sector, voluntary and charitable organisations throughout Great Britain (see NDA/UK website). The NDA's predecessor, Trust Nurses Association (TNA) was a voluntary network, established to provide peer support in the early 1990s, when National Health Service Trusts were first set up. The TNA was succeeded by the NDA in May 2002.

References

External links
Solihull website
NHSFT.gov.uk
Heart of England/NHS

1955 births
People educated at St Margaret's School, Bushey
Living people
English nurses
British nursing administrators
Dames Commander of the Order of the British Empire
People from Solihull
Place of birth missing (living people)